George Mallaby (4 November 1939 – 12 July 2004) was an English-born actor and screenwriter, best known for his roles in television in Australia and in his latter career in his native England.

Life
Mallaby was born in Hartlepool, United Kingdom, and moved to Australia with his parents when he was 16. His father was a policeman. Mallaby's first jobs were signwriting and crayfishing.

He was married to Ruth Bass in 1968 and they divorced in 1975.

He suffered a stroke in 1994, and subsequently used a wheelchair. He died of congestive heart failure in 2004.  He was survived by his widow Lenice, sons Guy and Luke, and daughter Kirsti from his first marriage.

Career
Mallaby made his acting debut at the Adelaide Festival of Arts, but soon obtained TV roles in Melbourne.

He played Detective Peter Barnes in the crime series Homicide in episodes 131 to 395 from 1967 to 1973, representing more than half the series run. Along with Alwyn Kurts, Leonard Teale and Norman Yemm, Mallaby was part of what is often considered "the consummate Homicide cast". He also wrote scripts for the series.

After Homicide he was an original cast member of The Box in the lead role of television executive  Paul Donovan, staying in the role from 1974 until 1975. He was later an original cast member of Cop Shop as head of a suburban police station's Criminal Investigation Branch, Detective Senior Sergeant Glenn Taylor. He continued in that role from the program's November 1977 debut until 1979. In 1980 he appeared in Prisoner for several months as social worker Paul Reid.  He also wrote scripts for Prisoner and Matlock Police. He said of scriptwriting that "writing requires a mood. It might be called a creative mood, I suppose. Unfortunately for those close to me, the mood often seems to come around 4 am. I get a spasm of creativity and just have to jump out of bed and start writing".

Mallaby also acted in mini-series including Power Without Glory, Sword of Honour and All the Way. He acted in feature films such as Tim Burstall's Eliza Fraser (1976), Petersen, and End Play.

During the late 1970s he returned to Britain. There he made appearances in various television series including Secret Army, Survivors and The Professionals, and appeared as a submarine crew member in the James Bond film The Spy Who Loved Me (1977).

His last regular role was as Colonel Mustard in Cluedo, the "game show-comedy-mystery series.

Other interests
He also started one of Australia's first hazelnut farms, something he saw as his "basic protection against the insecurity of show business".

Awards
 Won the Best Actor Logie award for role in The Box in 1975

Selected filmography
 Petersen (1974) - Executive
 The Box (1975) - Paul Donovan
 End Play (1976) - Robert Gifford
 Eliza Fraser (1976) - Lt. Otter
 The Spy Who Loved Me (1977) - USS Wayne Crewman
 The Highest Honor (1982) - Lt. Cmdr. Don Davidson
 Outbreak of Hostilities (1985) - Vince
 Niel Lynne (1985) - Mike O'Brien

Notes

References
Juddery, Mark (2004) "Sure cop, when a script called for it: George Mallaby, Actor, 1939–2004" (obituary) in The Sydney Morning Herald'', 2004-08-23, p. 40

External links
 

1939 births
2004 deaths
Australian male film actors
Australian male soap opera actors
Australian screenwriters
British male film actors
British male soap opera actors
English emigrants to Australia
Logie Award winners
People from Hartlepool
Actors from County Durham
20th-century Australian male actors
20th-century British male actors
21st-century Australian male actors
21st-century British male actors
20th-century Australian screenwriters